Alytus is a city in Lithuania.

Alytus may also refer to:

 Alytus County, a county in Lithuania
 Alytus District Municipality, a municipality in Lithuania
 Alytus railway station
 233661 Alytus, a minor planet

Sports 
 Alytus Arena
 Alytus Stadium
 BC Alytus
 BC Dzūkija, also known as Alytus Dzūkija
 FK Dainava Alytus
 SM Alytis-2 Alytus

See also 
 Alytus municipality (disambiguation)